Alex Cuba is the third studio album released by Cuban-Canadian singer-songwriter Alex Cuba. It was released in Canada in 2009, and in the US in 2010. The album was nominated for a Latin Grammy in 2010, for Best Male Pop Vocal Album. In 2011, it was nominated for a Grammy Award for Best Latin Pop Album.

Reception 
NPR wrote that the album, in contrast to his previous work, "finds Cuba sounding less moody than usual, and appropriately surrounded by funky and lighthearted music." Billboard called the track "Solo Tu" a highlight, referring to it as a "pop anthem". The Toronto Star wrote that he is "deftly mixing his Cuban son roots with good, old-fashioned 1970s pop and light rock."

Track listing 
This information adapted from Allmusic.

Personnel 

Alexander Abreu – flugelhorn, trumpet
Joby Baker – drums, engineer, mastering, mixing, producer, shaker, tambourine, backing vocals, wurlitzer
Joaquin Betancourt – horn arrangements
Alex Cuba – bass, cowbell, guitar, horn arrangements, primary artist, producer, shaker, vocals
Emilio Del Monte Jr. – congas
Emilio Del Monte – maracas
Jose Luis Hernandez – tenor sax
Andres Mendoza – management
Sarah Puentes – English translations
Amaury Perez Rodriguez – trombone
Vincent Toi – design
Jose-Raul Varonay – engineer
Christina Woerns – photography

References

2009 albums
Spanish-language albums
Alex Cuba albums